Han Young-sil (born November 14, 1957), is a professor and nutritionist in South Korea. She was president of Sookmyung Women's University.

Biography 
Han Young-sil was born on November 14, 1957, in Incheon, South Korea. In 1980, she was a graduate of Sookmyung Women's University. In 1992, University of Bonn Department of Food Science training courses were completed. From 2005, she became a cast member in KBS 2TV reality show Vitamin (비타민).

References 

1957 births
Nutritionists
South Korean women academics
Academic staff of Sookmyung Women's University
Presidents of universities and colleges in South Korea
South Korean television personalities
People from Incheon
Sookmyung Women's University alumni
University of Bonn alumni
Living people
Women heads of universities and colleges